Mid-Market (also Central Market) is a neighborhood and development area in San Francisco, California, bounded by Market Street to the north, 5th Street to the east, Mission Street to the south, and Van Ness Avenue to the west.

In 1906, Mid-Market was decimated by the 1906 San Francisco earthquake, and over the next century, Mid-Market would rebuild itself. In the 21st century, Mid-Market has served as a major economic area for San Francisco. Mid-Market contains the headquarters for Twitter, Block, Reddit, Zendesk, Uber, and Dolby, as well as historic buildings, such as the Old San Francisco Mint, the James R. Browning United States Courthouse, and the San Francisco Federal Building.

Mid-Market is part of California's 11th congressional district, as of 2021.

Geography
The Mid-Market redevelopment area is centered on Market Street starting at Fifth Street, ending at Van Ness Avenue, and including a number of buildings down to Mission Street.  It effectively creates a sub-neighborhood of the Tenderloin, SoMa, and Civic Center neighborhoods for the purpose of redeveloping the area.

History

Early history
Decimated by the 1906 earthquake and fire, the entire neighborhood was quickly rebuilt and for decades served as vibrant portion of the Market Street corridor.

Noted columnist Herb Caen referred to the neighborhood as 'le grand pissoir' because of the amount of public urination, defecation, and vagrancy due to a consolidation and expansion of homeless social services in the area, starting in the mid-1980s.

Economic growth
Past initiatives such as sponsored street murals have had little effect in revitalizing the neighborhood and in 2011 the city government turned to tax incentives to encourage businesses to move to the area.

The largest and most noteworthy of businesses to date has been Twitter, which moved into the old SF Furniture Mart building at Ninth and Market streets in 2012. The move by Twitter was initially met with a great deal of controversy, while other businesses such as Zendesk quietly took advantage of the tax break and moved to the area.   A number of arts groups, such as the Black Rock Arts Foundation, are working to move to Mid-Market. In October 2013, Square moved its headquarters to the mid-Market area, followed by Uber and Dolby. Reddit moved its corporate headquarters to Mid-Market in October 2019, in an area leased to Uber and Square.

Equally transformative, and often attributed to the new density of tech headquarters in Mid-Market, has been the concurrent increase of residential buildings, most notably high-rise apartments and condominium towers.

References

Neighborhoods in San Francisco
Market Street (San Francisco)